Local governments in Kerala enjoy very stable sources of revenue compared to their counterparts in the country. Even before the 73rd and 74th constitutional amendments in 1994, the situation was true. The sources of income earmarked for local governments, prior to the amendments,  were meant for providing civic services and welfare functions, but not for development functions. The scenario had changed after the constitutional amendments and enactment of conformity acts in the State in 1994. Significant portion of development functions of the State were devolved to local governments. In 1996, the State government earmarked one-third of its development plan size as devolved funds for bottom-up planning in development sectors transferred to local governments. This was followed by many measures to support the financial health of local governments in the State. The tiny State of Kerala, lying in the south-west corner of Indian Union, emerges as a classic paradigm in fiscal decentralization to local governments.

The categories of sources of finance are as described below.

Tax revenue of local governments
Taxation is the most appropriate way to fund local government services. Own local taxes make the revenue base of lower tier local governments potentially autonomous and strong.
Own taxes are directly demanded and collected by Village Panchayats, Municipalities and Corporations which are remaining very close to the people. District and Block Panchayats do not have the authority to collect taxes and have no consequent expenditure autonomy as that of others. They more or less function as spending agents of higher-level governments.
A three tier fragmented tax system in a federal system of governance has many inherent disadvantages. Decentralization of taxing powers hence may not fully match the decentralized expenditure, arising out of many institutions transferred as part of the functional devolution, in the new local government system.  Own taxes are assigned to local bodies and are levied by them. Property tax is an important item of local finance and a tool for empowering local governments. House tax, professional tax, vehicle tax, agricultural land tax, entertainment tax, pilgrim tax and tax on animals are the other important sources of tax revenue.

Property tax
Property tax constitutes a potential item of revenue for Grama Panchayats, Municipalities and Corporations.

Property tax is a fair, equitable and progressive tax that rises with the quantity of access to local services for the property. Very poor sections of communities are normally screened out of the property tax system. The Government of Kerala has decided to introduce plinth area based assessment of property tax for residential and non-residential commercial buildings in 1999.  As rules and operational instructions are not implemented on the basis of the new decision, old system of property tax collection based on rental value is still in force right now in the mid-2007.

In Grama Panchayat, property tax is assessed at the rate of 6–10 percent of the annual rental value of the building since 1993. But majority of local governments are collecting the lower range of taxes. As well, due to non-implementation of general periodic revision of property tax in 1998 by the State Government, the usual periodic increase of around 25 percent could not be enjoyed by local governments. As well, there has been inefficiency in collection of property tax, which can be improved by providing properly designed incentives and enforcing of heightened penalty for non-payment.

In Municipalities, the rate is 5 to 25 percent and in Corporation 6 to 25 percent of the annual rental value.

Profession tax
Profession tax is collected from all companies and individuals transacting business or engaged in a profession for at least 60 days in a half-year. They are bound to pay the tax at such rates as are fixed by the concerned local government subject to the maximum rates prescribed by the Government. The rates are as follows:-

Table:Rates of Profession Tax in Grama Panchayats & Municipalities

Profession tax constitutes the second largest source of own income for the Grama Panchayats and has the fifth position for the urban local bodies.

Entertainment tax
Entertainment tax is the third largest source of income for Grama Panchayats and the second largest source of income for Municipalities and Corporations. In many Municipalities, entertainment tax constitutes the single largest source of own revenue. Entertainment tax is an own tax of local governments in Kerala. But in many Grama Panchayats there are no theatres. Entertainment tax is fixed between 24 and 48 percent of the price of admission as per the amendment of Entertainment Act made in 1999. But the rate has been reduced to 25 per cent for Other language films and 15 per cent for Malayalam films Gross collection of entertainment tax is on the decline both in Grama Panchayats and Municipalities due to emergence of cable television network everywhere in the State whereas cable television has not been brought under the tax net in spite of many government decisions.

Advertisement tax
Advertisement tax has relatively good potential in a consumerist state like Kerala where marketing of consumer goods is quite widespread even in rural areas. But less than 15 percent of the Grama Panchayats are collecting advertisement tax. The tax can be collected based on bye-laws framed by the Grama Panchayat and Urban Local Governments and the minimum rates for different types are prescribed by the State Government. The local governments can fix any upper limit for advertisement tax. There should also be penal provision for 'escaped tax' to enforce the tax strictly.

Service tax
Service tax, existing only in Grama Panchayats as an additional tax, is collected based on the minimum rate fixed by the Government. The State Finance Commission's recommendations, to have an independent service tax, has been accepted but not put to practice. In Urban Local Governments service tax is an inbuilt component of property tax.

Show tax
Local governments in the lowest tier can levy and collect show tax on every show which includes any entertainment, exhibition, performance, amusement, game, sport or race that is performed in their territory. Since the tax so negligible many local governments are ignoring to collect them and State Government is thinking of ignoring it.

Table : Rates of Show tax

Cess on conversion of land use
This is a Cess levied by local governments for conversion of land from paddy field, marshy land, pond or water body into garden or building site. This one-time cess is collected at the rate of 5 percent of the capital value of the land for conversion of paddy fields and 8.5 percent for other kinds of conversion.

Other Municipal Taxes
Municipalities in Kerala can levy, based on its resolution, tax on domestic animals, vessels and vehicles. This is a very insignificant item of tax.

Municipalities as well can allow the council to collect, in the manner decided by it, a tax on timber brought into the municipality at the rate of Rs.24/- per tonne. This also has fallen into disuse and is declining year after year.

Surcharge
Grama Panchayats are allowed to levy surcharges up to 5 percent of the property tax for meeting any extraordinary expenditure by way of implementation of a scheme, plan or projects. In Municipalities, a surcharge not exceeding 10 percent of any tax other than profession tax can be collected for providing any specific service or amenity. There can be only two surcharges at a time.

Urban Local Governments have never tapped this source and Grama Panchayats are reluctant to impose surcharges.

Non-tax Revenue
Non-tax revenue constitutes 51 percent of the total own collected revenue (Own collected revenue does not contain assigned and shared taxes and grant in-aid) of Grama Panchayats, 42.62 percent in the case of Municipalities and 24.39 percent in the case of Corporations in the past. This is an important source that can be enhanced considerably.

Licence fee
This constitutes the most important source of non-tax revenue. The following are the important items for which license fees or maintenance fees are collected by local governments.

Trade Licences

In Grama Panchayats, licensing of trades is done under Kerala Panchayat Raj (Dangerous and Offensive Trade) rules. The rule fixes the maximum fee based on turn over. Urban local governments can set the rates as per section 492(5) of the Kerala Municipality Act 1994 and a look at the fees being collected shows that the local governments set very low rates.

In Urban Local Governments, the rates for construction or establishment of factories and installation of plants or machinery were fixed as per the rules issued in 1966. The rates were never revised for nearly four decades. But in rural local governments, the rates fixed a decade ago are in force.

1.	Licences under Prevention of Food Adulteration Act.
Central Act on prevention of food adulteration and the rules issued under it empowers the local governments at the lower tier to issue licences under it and collect fees for issuing licences. The rates of fees were recently revised as per the revised PFA Rules, but the order was frozen by Kerala Government since 7 June 2007.

2.	Licences under Kerala Cinema Regulation Act.
Kerala Cinema Regulation Rules in accordance with the Kerala Cinema Regulation Act govern the Theatre construction and installation of machinery. The existing rates cannot be revised as film is a declining industry.

3.	Licensing of Private Slaughter House.
Rate of rent and fee for slaughtering animals in public and private slaughter house is fixed in Grama Panchayats as per rules framed under the section 229 & 230 of Kerala Panchayat Raj Act 1994 and in Municipalities as decided by the Municipal Council under section 452 of the Kerala Municipality Act 1994.

4.	Licensing of Private Markets.
Licence fee for opening private markets are fixed based on the floor area of the market and the renewal fee does not exceed one-third of the income the licence has earned from the market in the previous year.

5.	Licences under the Kerala Places of Public Resort Act.
Rule 28 of the Kerala Places of Public Resort Rules 1965 in accordance with Kerala Places of Public Resort Act 1963 fixes the rate for licence based on area, type of building etc. of the public resort. Differential rates are provided for resorts housed in permanent buildings, temporary buildings, enclosures without a roof etc.

6.	Licensing of Private Parking and Halting Places.
The licence fee is fixed as per section 227 & 228 of Kerala Panchayat Raj Act 1994 and section 472 of Kerala Municipality Act 1994 for public halting of carts, auto rickshaws, motor vehicles, motor boats etc. and for storing goods in open space.

7.	Licensing of Burial and Burning Grounds .
Lower tier local governments can maintain burial and burning grounds and collect fees for burning of carcasses.

8.	Licensing of Brokers, Commission Agents, Weigh men, Measures etc..
The licence fee is fixed as per the section 13 of the Kerala Panchayat Raj (Public and Private Market) rules and section 458 (2) (e) of the Kerala Municipality Act.

9.	Licensing of Animal Stalls kept for Commercial Purposes.
This licence is issued as per section 444 of the Kerala Municipality Act. Now council fixes the rate and there is need to fix minimum rate by government. The provision needs to be extended to rural areas too.

10.	Licensing of Special Trades like Butchers, Fishmongers, Poultries, Commission Agents and Brokers.

The licence is issued as per section 469 of the Kerala Municipality Act and that need to be included in the list of trade licences in Panchayats.

Gate fees
There are entry fees obtained from the highest bidder who in turn regulate entry based on certain fees. Major sources are: -
1.	Public Market.
2.	Public Parking and Halting Places.
3.	Public Slaughter Houses

Income from Property - Rent
Rent is an important item of non-tax revenue for Urban Local Governments and urbanized Grama Panchayats. Rents could be classified based on the type of property.

1.	Rent from buildings

2.	Rent from lands

3.	Rent from cloak rooms and comfort stations

Income from property other than rent
This can be classified into three.

1.	Proceeds from sale of right to collect river sand.

2.	Proceeds from sale of right to fish.

3.	Proceeds from sale of usufructs.

Permit fees
Permit fees are of two kinds.
1.	Fee for building permits
2.	Fee for permits for the construction, establishment or installation of factories, workshops or work places where electricity is used.

Registration fees
This can be grouped as follows: -

1.	Registration of Hospital and Para Medical Institutions.

2.	Registration of Tutorials.

3.	Registration of Births and Deaths.

4.	Registration of Contractors (only in Urban Local Governments)

5.	Registration of lodgings (only in Malabar area under the Madras Public Health Act. Southern part of Kerala cannot register as no rule has been formulated so far based on the Travancore Public Health Act).

Service/user charges
This relate to charges collected for use of utilities and amenities provided by the local governments. User charge remains to be more potential area of finance than a reality now. Charges are levied on the direct recipient of service with correct price.

Income from Ferries
As per the Kerala Panchayat Raj Act / the Kerala Municipality Act and the various Ferries Acts, function of providing ferries has been transferred to the Grama Panchayats and Urban Local Governments. This income could be either by auctioning of the right to ply ferries or by charging from users.

Fines and penalties
The local governments realize fines and penalties when there is a contravention of regulations or payment is belated. A study done in Municipalities shows that there is serious laxity in the enforcement of penal provisions.

Sundry items
These miscellaneous sources of revenue could be listed as follows:

•	Proceeds from auctioning of meat stalls (done in a few Grama Panchayats only).
•	Interest on deposits.
•	Endowments.
•	Return on investments like shares.
•	Contributions/donations.
•	Hire charges of vehicles/machinery.
•	Income from cattle pounds.
•	Sale of Forms.
•	Sale of unserviceable articles and fallen trees.
•	Other items which cannot be classified.

Shared tax
Local governments are usually dependent on transfer of resources, since own resources are almost insufficient. Despite the transfers, the resources are inadequate to provide even the most minimal level of services. Government of Kerala has decided to make a radical departure from the system of assigning and sharing specific taxes and stipulated that a fixed proportion of the tax revenue of the State Government has to be handed over to local governments as Maintenance Fund and General Purpose Fund.

A well-designed system of intergovernmental transfer is essential to any decentralisation strategy and the transfer should be transparent, predictable and not subject to negotiation. Kerala shows the right way in this regard also. This system of vertical sharing will ensure guaranteed and predictable revenue to local governments thereby insulating them from political impacts in the higher-level governments.

Maintenance Grant.
Five and half percentage of the annual own tax revenue of the State Government has been earmarked to the local governments as non-plan grant in aid for maintenance of assets including transferred assets under the control of the local governments. In order to avoid dis-proportionality between asset creation, maintenance and operation of it, appropriate amount of non-plan funds need to be made available for meeting the operational cost and maintenance requirements of the plan-assets. Unless adequate provision for maintenance is made, the devolved plan funds would be frittered away on maintenance.

Maintenance Fund is meant for managing all maintenance expenses for running the transferred institutions except wages, educational concessions/ scholarships to students, supply of books and equipments and conducting noon feeding in schools. The expenses include payment of rent, repair of equipment including vehicles, purchase of school/hospital equipments, meeting telephone charges and vehicle repairing costs.

In 2004–2005 Rs.325.75 crores have been earmarked as maintenance fund for all local governments in the State.

Distribution of maintenance fund
District and Block Panchayats

As per recommendations of the Second Finance Commission, one-seventh of the maintenance fund be earmarked for District and Block Panchayats and divided between them in 19:1 ratio. The share of Block Panchayats will be done equally among them. The share of District Panchayas would be made two equal halves and half of the share would be shared among district panchayats in the ratio of transferred village roads and other district roads. Other half of the share would be distributed among district panchayats based on norms for repair of non-road assets under transferred to them earlier from the State Government and under them now.
Grama Panchayats, Municipalities and Corporations.
Six-sevenths of the maintenance grant will go to grama panchayat, municipalities and corporations.  Seven-eighths of this share will be distributed between grama panchayats, municipalities and corporations in the ratio of current distribution of Vehicle Tax Compensation (VTC). One-eighth of this share will be distributed according to the maintenance needs of non-road assets, own and transferred assets other than those created after 1995, as determined by norms. The remaining portion of the maintenance grant in excess over Rs. 140 crores at 2000/01 prices may be distributed as per the norms of plan grant in aid.

The norms have been altered by the Third State Finance Commission and there is no much substantial difference, even though the amount fixed has been reduced slightly.

General Purpose Fund
In lieu of erstwhile assigned taxes, shared taxes and statutory / non statutory grant in aids, three and half percent of the own tax revenue of the State Government would be devolved to local government institutions as General Purpose fund as per the recommendations of the Second State Finance Commission Report. The grant in aid can be used for meeting operating cost of local governments such as rent on building, electricity, vehicle running charges, telephone charges etc. of the transferred sectoral institutions. The amount earmarked for this purpose in 2004–05 in the budget was Rs.205.32 crores.
This grant in aid would subsume basic tax grant, surcharge on stamp duty, VTC, rural pool grant, the specific purpose and general-purpose grant and all non-plan grant in aids. The General Purpose Fund continues without much substantial change.
Distribution.
As one time exercise, the state Government made a normative assessment of the establishment cost and office expense requirements of Block and District Panchayats and determined the share of them.

The remaining amount were distributed as follows: -

Inter-se Distribution of General Purpose Grant.
Municipalities and Corporations.
The inter-se distribution among the Municipalities and Corporations would be entirely on the basis of population.
Grama Panchayats.
A corpus of Rs.10 crore was set apart for filling the gap between obligatory expenditure (such as establishment expenses, street-light and water supply) and the revenue usable for this purpose as detailed further (such as sum of own revenue and share of general purpose grant for the panchayat).

The second and third grade grama panchayats would get entire amount to fill the gap. First grade grama panchayats will get 50 percent of the gap and the special grade panchayat will get 25 percent of the gap.

The remaining portions of the general purpose grant will be distributed among grama panchayats based on population in them.

Plan assistance to local governments
Plan grants play a vital role in the development initiatives of local governments for execution of the sectoral projects. Plan assistance to local governments is in two streams. The first stream consists of Centrally sponsored or State sponsored schemes. The second stream is the plan grant provided by the State Government in an untied manner.

Centrally sponsored/State-sponsored schemes
Under this stream, the scheme guidelines are formulated by Central or the State Government as the case may be and the local government has a limited role in functioning as an 'agency' by way of deciding the location or beneficiary of the project and executing the scheme.

Under this sponsored scheme, the departments handling the funds would decide the formula for devolution of funds between the urban and rural areas, among the three tiers of panchayats in rural areas and inter-se distribution within the particular tier. Based on this formula, funds would be allocated to local governments. The formula and distribution of funds among local governments would be communicated to all local governments by head of department of each sector in the State by the first month of each financial year. The release of funds will be made immediately.

Plan Grant in Aid to Local Governments
Under the stream, the local governments have full autonomy in deciding their priorities, formulating the schemes and implementing them within a general overall framework. One third of the State's plan outlay excluding State sponsored schemes is made available to the local governments for formulating plan projects of their choice.
Plan grant-in-aid includes: -

•	General sector grant

•	Special component plan (SCP) and

•	Tribal sub plan (TSP)

The general sector grant includes the normal share of plan funds from the State, the Eleventh Finance Commission (EFC) Grant and the share under Rural Infrastructure Development Fund (RIDF).

Central Finance Commission Grant
The funds to local governments under Central Finance Commission grant would be passed down as such to the local government institutions as bundled along with Development Funds devolved to local governments.

Inter se Distribution of the Grant.
EFC grant is devolved to the local governments on the basis of population. The amount earmarked to each local government under this item will be enlisted in the budget document.

EFC grant is distributed only to Grama Panchayats, Municipalities and Corporations. RIDF is given only to District Panchayats and Block Panchayats having general sector of at least Rs.50 lakhs.

Special Component Plan (SCP).

Plan grant under special component plan is distributed between rural and urban local governments as per the ratio of scheduled caste population in rural and urban areas (87.95: 12.05).

The share for the three tier Panchayats has again been divided in the ratio of 60:20:20 among Grama, Block and District Panchayats. Inter-se distribution of SCP funds is purely based on the scheduled caste population in the respective local governments.

Tribal Sub Plan (TSP)

The plan grant under TSP is distributed between rural and urban local governments as per the ratio of scheduled tribe population in rural and urban areas (97.67:2.33). The distribution of TSP funds under urban local governments is limited to four municipalities i.e. Punlaur, North Paravur, Kalpetta and Kanhangad based on tribal population.

The share of three tier panchayats is apportioned in the ratio of 50:20:30 among grama block and district panchayat.

The inter-se distribution of TSP funds is purely based on the scheduled tribe population in the respective local governments.

See also
 Finance
 Local Government Finance Act 1992
 State Finance Commission (Kerala)

External links
 Fiscal Decentralisation in Kerala. World Bank study
 Local Governments in Kerala. Chapter 22 of Kerala Economic Review. Govt of Kerala
 Website on Decentralisation and Local Governance in Kerala

Reports on Local Finance (Kerala)
 The First State Finance Commission Report, Government of Kerala, 1996
 The Second State Finance Commission Report, Government of Kerala, 2001
 The Third State Finance Commission Report, Government of Kerala, 2005
 Kerala Panchayat Finance Commission Report, 1985, Chairman Avukkaderkutty Naha

Further reading
 	Kerala, Government of (1985): Report of the Panchayat Finance Commission ( Chairman Avukhadder Kutty Naha. Thiruvananthapuram, Government of Kerala).
 	Kerala, Government of (1994): Report of the Kerala Municipal Finance Commission. Thiruvananthapuram, Government of Kerala.
 	Kerala, Government of (1996): State Finance Commission Report, Chairman P M Abraham. Thiruvananthapuram, Government of Kerala.
       Kerala, Government of (2001): State Finance Commission Report, Chairman Dr Praphat Patnaik
       Kerala, Government of (2005): State Finance Commission Report, Chairman K V Rabeendranathan Nair
 	Local Government in Kerala: Reforms, Decentralised Development and Local Government Finances, Mulagunnathukavu, Kerala Institute of Local Administration,2003.
 	Nair, R P (2004) Mobilisation of resources by Panchayats: Potential and feasibilities (A case study of six selected panchayats in Kerala). Discussion Paper No.70 Kerala Research Programme on Local Level Development. Thiruvananthapuram, Centre for Development Studies
 	Sethi, Geetha ed. (2004) Fiscal Decentralization to Rural Governments in India. New Delhi, Oxford University Press.
 	Sethi, Geetha et al.(2004) India: Fiscal decentralization to rural governments. World Bank Report No. 26654-IN. See website WWW.worldbank.org

Local government in Kerala
Government finances in Kerala
Local government finance